The 2014 WDF Europe Cup was the 19th edition of the WDF Europe Cup darts tournament, organised by the World Darts Federation. It was held in Bucharest, Romania from September 23 to 27.


Medal tally
No information about silver and bronze medals in overall men's and women's competition.

Entered teams
31 countries/associations entered a men's selection in the event.
25 countries/associations entered a womans's selection in the event.

Men's singles

Men's Pairs

Men's team
Round Robin

Knock Out

Women's singles

Woman's Pairs

Woman's Team
Round Robin

Knock Out

References

Darts tournaments
WDF Europe Cup
WDF Europe